Brooksbank  may refer to:

Brooksbank baronets, of Healaugh Manor in the County of York, a title in the Baronetage of the United Kingdom
Jack Brooksbank (born 1986), husband of Princess Eugenie and member of the British royal family
Joseph Brooksbank (born 1612), English cleric and schoolmaster
Stamp Brooksbank (1694–1756), English MP and Governor of the Bank of England